|}

The Dragon Stakes is a Listed flat horse race in Great Britain open to horses aged two years only.
It is run at Sandown Park over a distance of 5 furlongs and 10 yards (1,015 metres), and it is scheduled to take place each year in July.

The race was first run in 1992.

The best winner of the race has probably been Hoh Magic, who went on to win the Prix Morny.

Records
Leading jockey (4 wins):
 Richard Quinn – Bodyguard (1997), Vita Spericolata (1999), Berk The Jerk (2001), Bella Tusa (2002)

Leading trainer (3 wins):
 Richard Hannon Sr. – Sarson (1998), Zavone (2005), Zebedee (2010)

Winners

See also
 Horse racing in Great Britain
 List of British flat horse races

References

Racing Post:

Flat races in Great Britain
Sandown Park Racecourse
Flat horse races for two-year-olds